South Frontenac is a township in Frontenac County in eastern Ontario, Canada. It was amalgamated in 1998 from the former townships of Bedford, Loughborough, Portland, and Storrington.

The Holleford crater is located in the township near the community of Holleford.

Communities

Battersea
 Bedford
 Bedford Mills
 Bellrock
 Bobs Lake
 Bradshaw
 Brewer Lake
 Buck Lake
 Burnt Hills
 Burridge
 Cedar Lake
 Cranstons Beach
 Davidsons Beach
 Desert Lake
 Fermoy  
 Forest
 Glendower
Harrowsmith
Hartington
 Holleford  
 Ida Hill  
Inverary
 Keelerville  
 Lake Opinicon  
 Latimer
 Lower Holleford
 Maple Hill  
 Milburn
 Missouri
 Moons Corners
 Murvale
 Murvale Station
 Perth Road
 Petworth
 Railton  
 Raymonds Corners  
 Rosedale
 Salem
 Spaffordton
 Star Corners
 Sunbury
Sydenham
 Verona  
 Wilmer

Demographics 

According to the Canada 2021 Census:
Mother tongue:
 English as first language: 97.89%
 French as first language: 1.93%
 Other as first language: 0.18%

Notable people
John Babcock, the last Canadian World War I veteran, was born in South Frontenac.
Mike Smith, professional goalie in the National Hockey League.

Education 
South Frontenac, along with Central Frontenac, North Frontenac and the Frontenac Islands, send students to schools part of the Limestone District School Board, based in neighbouring Kingston.

Notes
A village named Portland is located in Township of Rideau Lakes approximately 60 kilometres east of the former Portland township. It is unknown if the township and the village had any connections with the same name due to its close proximity. In 1998, Portland Township was amalgamated into South Frontenac.

See also
List of townships in Ontario

References

Other map sources:

External links

Lower-tier municipalities in Ontario
Municipalities in Frontenac County
Township municipalities in Ontario